Erika Akiyama (born December 31, 1964, Fukuoka) is a retired Japanese rhythmic gymnast, a gymnastics coach.

She competed for Japan in the individual rhythmic gymnastics all-around competition at two Olympic Games: in 1984 in Los Angeles in 1988 in Seoul. In 1984 she was 13th in the qualification and advanced to the final, placing 13th overall, in 1988 she tied for 17th place in the qualification and again advanced to the final, placing 15th overall.

References

External links 
 Erika Akiyama at Sports-Reference.com

1964 births
Living people
Japanese rhythmic gymnasts
Gymnasts at the 1984 Summer Olympics
Gymnasts at the 1988 Summer Olympics
Olympic gymnasts of Japan
Sportspeople from Fukuoka Prefecture